Ehud Barak (born Ehud Brog; 12 February 1942) is an Israeli general and politician who served as the tenth prime minister from 1999 to 2001. He was leader of the Labor Party until January 2011. He previously held the posts of defense minister and deputy prime minister under Ehud Olmert and then in Benjamin Netanyahu's second government from 2007 to 2013. He attempted a political comeback, running in the September 2019 Israeli legislative election as the leader of a new party that he formed. His party merged with other parties to form an alliance called the Democratic Union, but the alliance did not win enough seats for him to become a member of the Knesset.

A lieutenant general in the Israel Defense Forces (IDF), Barak shares with two others the honor of being the most highly decorated soldier in Israel's history, having taken part in many battles and combat missions. He was appointed Chief of General Staff in 1991, serving until 1995. He is a graduate in physics, mathematics, and economics from the Hebrew University of Jerusalem and Stanford University.

Biography

Ehud Barak was born on kibbutz Mishmar HaSharon in what was then Mandatory Palestine. He is the eldest of four sons of Esther (née Godin; 25 June 1914 – 12 August 2013) and Yisrael Mendel Brog (24 August 1910 – 8 February 2002).

His paternal grandparents, Frieda and Reuven Brog, were murdered in Pušalotas (Pushelat) in northern Lithuania (then ruled by Russian Empire) in 1912, leaving his father orphaned at the age of two. Barak's maternal grandparents, Elka and Shmuel Godin, died at the Treblinka extermination camp during the Holocaust.

Ehud hebraized his family name from "Brog" to "Barak" in 1972. It was during his military service that he met his future wife, Nava (née Cohen, born 8 April 1947 in Tiberias). They had three daughters together: Michal (born 9 August 1970), Yael (born 23 October 1974) and Anat (born 16 October 1981). He has grandchildren. Barak divorced Nava in August 2003. On 30 July 2007, Barak married Nili Priel (born 25 April 1944) in a small ceremony in his private residence. In his spare time, Barak enjoys reading works by writers such as Johann Wolfgang von Goethe, and he is a classical pianist, with many years of study behind him.

Barak earned his bachelor's degree in physics and mathematics from the Hebrew University of Jerusalem in 1968, and his master's degree in engineering-economic systems in 1978 from Stanford University, California.

Military career

Barak joined the Israel Defense Forces (IDF) in 1959. He served in the IDF for 35 years, rising to the position of Chief of the General Staff and the rank of Rav Aluf (Lieutenant-General), the highest in the Israeli military.
During his service as a commando in the elite Sayeret Matkal, Barak led several highly acclaimed operations, such as: "Operation Isotope", the mission to free the hostages on board the hijacked Sabena Flight 571 at Lod Airport in 1972; the covert 1973 Israeli raid on Lebanon in Beirut, in which he was disguised as a woman to kill members of the Palestine Liberation Organization; Barak was also a key architect of the June 1976 Operation Entebbe, another rescue mission to free the hostages of the Air France aircraft hijacked by terrorists and forced to land at the Entebbe Airport in Uganda. These highly acclaimed operations, along with Operation Bayonet, led to the dismantling of Palestinian terrorist cell Black September. It has been alluded that Barak also masterminded the Tunis Raid on 16 April 1988, in which PLO leader Abu Jihad was killed.

During the Yom Kippur War, Barak commanded an improvised regiment of tanks which, among other things, helped rescue paratrooper battalion 890, commanded by Yitzhak Mordechai, which was suffering heavy losses in the Battle of the Chinese Farm. He went on the command the 401st armored brigade and the 611st "Pillar of Fire" and 252nd "Sinai" divisions, before his appointment to head the IDF's Planning Directorate. Barak also participated in the Siege of Beirut, overseeing it from Beirut International Airport.
Barak later served as head of Aman, the Military Intelligence Directorate (1983–85), head of Central Command (1986–87) and Deputy Chief of the General Staff (1987–91). He served as Chief of the General Staff between 1 April 1991 and 1 January 1995. During this period he implemented the first Oslo Accords and participated in the negotiations towards the Israel–Jordan peace treaty.

Barak was awarded the Medal of Distinguished Service and four Chief of Staff citations (Tzalash HaRamatkal) for courage and operational excellence. These five decorations make him the most decorated soldier in Israeli history (jointly with close friend Nechemya Cohen). In 1992 he was awarded the Legion of Merit (Commander) by the United States. In 2012, he was again awarded by the United States with the Department of Defense Medal for Distinguished Public Service.

Political career

On 7 July 1995, Barak was appointed Minister of Internal Affairs by Yitzhak Rabin. When Shimon Peres formed a new government following Rabin's assassination in November 1995, Barak was made Minister of Foreign Affairs (1995–96). He was elected to the Knesset on the Labor Party list in 1996, and served as a member of the Knesset Foreign Affairs and Defense Committee. Following internal elections after Peres' defeat in the election for Prime Minister in 1996, Barak became the leader of the Labor Party.

Prime Minister of Israel
 

In the 1999 Prime Ministerial election, Barak beat Benjamin Netanyahu by a wide margin. However, he sparked controversy by deciding to form a coalition with the ultra-Orthodox party Shas, who had won an unprecedented 17 seats in the 120-seat Knesset. Shas grudgingly agreed to Barak's terms that they eject their leader Aryeh Deri, a convicted felon, and enact reform to "clean up" in-party corruption. Consequentially, the left wing Meretz party quit the coalition after they failed to agree on the powers to be given to a Shas deputy minister in the Ministry of Education.

In 1999 Barak gave a campaign promise to end Israel's 22-year-long occupation of Southern Lebanon within a year. On 24 May 2000 Israel withdrew from Southern Lebanon. On 7 October, three Israeli soldiers were killed in a border raid by Hezbollah and their bodies were subsequently captured. The bodies of these soldiers, along with the living Elhanan Tenenbaum, were eventually exchanged for Lebanese captives in 2004.

The Barak government resumed peace negotiations with the PLO, stating that "Every attempt [by the State of Israel] to keep hold of this area [the West Bank and Gaza] as one political entity leads, necessarily, to either a nondemocratic or a non-Jewish state. Because if the Palestinians vote, then it is a binational state, and if they don't vote it is an apartheid state." As part of these negotiations, Barak took part in the Camp David 2000 Summit which was meant finally to resolve the Israeli–Palestinian conflict but failed. Barak also allowed Foreign Minister Shlomo Ben-Ami to attend the Taba Summit with the leadership of the Palestinian Authority, after his government had fallen.

Domestic issues

On 22 August 1999, Barak appointed the Tal committee which dealt with the controversial issue of ultra-Orthodox Jews' exemption from military service.
Following the failure of the Camp David summit with Arafat and Bill Clinton in the summer of 2000, when the original 7 years mandate of the PNA expired, and just after Israel pulled out its last troops out of southern Lebanon in May 2000, the weeks-long Riots in October 2000 led to the killing of twelve Israeli Arabs and one Palestinian by Israel Police and one Jewish civilian by Israeli Arabs.

Resignation
In 2001, Barak called a special election for Prime Minister. In the contest, he was defeated by Likud leader Ariel Sharon, and subsequently resigned as Labor leader and from the Knesset. He left Israel to work as a senior advisor with United States-based Electronic Data Systems. He also partnered with a private equity company focused on "security-related" work.

Return to politics

In 2005, Barak announced his return to Israeli politics, and ran for leadership of the Labor Party in November. However, in light of his weak poll showings, Barak dropped out of the race early and declared his support for veteran statesman Shimon Peres. Following his failed attempt to maintain leadership of the Labor party, Barak became a partner of the investment company SCP Private Equity Partners, Pennsylvania. He also established a company "Ehud Barak Limited" which is thought to have made over NIS 30 million.

After Peres lost the race to Amir Peretz and left the Labor party, Barak announced he would stay at the party, despite his shaky relationship with its newly elected leader. He declared, however, that he would not run for a spot on the Labor party's Knesset list for the March 2006 elections. Barak's attempt to return to a prominent role in Israel politics seemed to have failed. However, Peretz's hold on the Labor leadership proved unexpectedly shaky as he was badly damaged by negative views of his performance as Defense Minister during the 2006 Lebanon War, which was seen as something less than a success in Israel.

In January 2007, Barak launched a bid to recapture the leadership of the Labor party in a letter acknowledging "mistakes" and "inexperience" during his tenure as Prime Minister. In early March 2007, a poll of Labor Party primary voters put Barak ahead of all other opponents, including Peretz. In the first round of voting, on 28 May 2007, he gained 39% of the votes, more than his two closest rivals, but not enough to win the election.

As a result, Barak faced a runoff against the second-place finisher, Ami Ayalon, on 12 June 2007, which he won by a narrow margin.

Barak has been critical of what he sees as racist sentiments that have recently been expressed by some Israeli rabbis and rebbetzins; he views such statements as a threat to Israeli unity and that they may lead Israeli society into a "dark and dangerous place".

Defense Minister

As head of the Labor Party
After winning back the leadership of the Labor party, Barak was sworn in as Minister of Defense on 18 June 2007, as part of Prime Minister Olmert's cabinet reshuffle. However, on 1 July 2007, Barak led a successful effort in the Labor central committee to stipulate that Labor would leave the government coalition if Olmert did not resign by September or October 2007. At that time the Winograd Commission would publish its final report on the performance of the Israel Defense Forces and its civilian leadership. The preliminary Winograd report released earlier this year laid most of the blame on Olmert for poorly planning, executing, and reviewing war strategies in the 2006 conflict against Hezbollah.

From December 2008 to January 2009, Barak led the Israel Defense Forces through Operation Cast Lead in his capacity as Minister of Defence.

Labor won only 13 out of the 120 Knesset seats in the 2009 elections, making them the fourth largest party. Barak and other Labor officials initially stated they would not take part in the next government. However, over the objections of some in the Labor party, in March 2009, Barak reached an agreement under which Labor joined the governing coalition led by Benjamin Netanyahu. Barak retained his position as Defense Minister.

Leaving the Labor Party
In January 2011, Labor Party leader Barak formed a breakaway party, Independence, which enabled him to maintain his loyal Labor's MK faction within Netanyahu's government, and prevented the departure of Labor party as a whole from Netanyahu's coalition-government. Labor previously threatened to force Barak to do so. After Barak's move, Netanyahu was able to maintain a majority of 66 MK (out of 120 in the Knesset), previously having 74 MKs within his majority coalition.

In February 2011, Barak attended a ceremony at the UN for the International Day of Commemoration in memory of the victims of the Holocaust. Barak told the UN General Assembly that "an independent, strong, thriving and peaceful State of Israel is the vengeance of the dead."

Barak's Independence party was due to run in a legislative election, but decided not to in 2012, and retired from politics. Barak planned to quit since Operation Pillar of Defense but postponed it until later that year.

Barak stated during an American television interview that he would "probably" strive for nuclear weapons if he were in Iran's position, adding "I don't delude myself that they are doing it just because of Israel". This comment has been criticized and compared to Barak's comment in 1998 during a television interview when he said that if he were a Palestinian he would probably have joined one of the terror organizations.

Return to political life
On 26 June 2019, Barak announced his return to politics and his intention to form a new party named the Israel Democratic Party, intending to challenge Netanyahu in the September 2019 Israeli legislative election. The party ran with Meretz and other parties in the Democratic Union alliance, which received five seats. Barak himself did not enter the knesset.

Financial assets
In an interview with Haaretz reported in January 2015, Barak was asked to explain the source of his "big" capital, with which he "bought 5 apartments and connected them," and by which he "lives in a giant rental apartment in a luxury high rise." Barak said he currently earns more than a $1 million a year, and that from 2001 to 2007, he also earned more than a $1 million every year, from giving lectures and from consulting for hedge funds. Barak also said he made millions of dollars more from his investments in Israeli real estate properties.

In the interview, Barak was asked whether he is a lobbyist who earns a living from "opening doors". The interviewer stated "You have arrived recently at the Kazakhstan despot Nazarbayev and the president of Ghana. You are received immediately." Barak confirmed that he has been received by these heads of state but denied earning money from opening doors for international business deals for Israeli and foreign corporations, and said he does not see any ethical or moral problems in his business activities. He further said there is no logic to demand of him, after "the natural process in democracy has ended" to not utilize the tools he accumulated in his career to secure his financial future. When asked if his financial worth is $10–15 million, Barak said "I'm not far from there."

Awards and decorations

See also

 List of Israel's Chiefs of the General Staff
 List of wartime cross-dressers

References

Bibliography
 Bregman, Ahron Elusive Peace: How the Holy Land Defeated America.
 Clinton, Bill (2005). My Life. Vintage. .
 Dromi, Uri (5 November 2005). "Still craving peace 10 years after Rabin". New Straits Times, p. 20.

External links

 
 
 
 
 
 
 
 
 
 Defense Minister Ehud Barak at Ynetnews, profile

1942 births
Living people
Israeli Ashkenazi Jews
Commanders of the Legion of Merit
Directors of the Military Intelligence Directorate (Israel)
Hebrew University of Jerusalem alumni
Independence (Israeli political party) politicians
Israeli Labor Party politicians
Israeli people of Lithuanian-Jewish descent
Jewish Israeli politicians
Ashkenazi Jews in Mandatory Palestine
Kibbutzniks
Leaders of political parties in Israel
Members of the 14th Knesset (1996–1999)
Members of the 15th Knesset (1999–2003)
Members of the 18th Knesset (2009–2013)
Ministers of Agriculture of Israel
Ministers of Defense of Israel
Ministers of Education of Israel
Ministers of Foreign Affairs of Israel
Ministers of Internal Affairs of Israel
Ministers of Tourism of Israel
One Israel politicians
People from Central District (Israel)
Prime Ministers of Israel
Recipients of the Medal of Distinguished Service
Stanford University alumni
Wartime cross-dressers
Grand Crosses of the Order of the Star of Romania
Leaders of the Opposition (Israel)